Blair M. Wingo Linne (born November 27, 1984) is an American model, actress, and Christian spoken word artist.

Career 
She appeared on several television shows including Alias, Days of Our Lives, Malcolm in the Middle, Boston Public, The Parkers, American Dreams, and her own Saturday morning show, SK8. Wingo's poetry has been featured on Nightline and in the Los Angeles Times.

Personal life 
She is married to Christian rapper Shai Linne.

Filmography

Film

Television

References

External links

1984 births
Living people
American child actresses
Actresses from Grand Rapids, Michigan
21st-century American women